The International Nathiagali Summer College on Physics and Contemporary Needs (INSC), was founded by Nobel laureate in Physics Dr. Abdus Salam (then-Science Advisor to the Prime minister) to promote physics and scientific research activities in Pakistan. Having suggested by Professor Abdus Salam to the Government of Pakistan, it was established by the Pakistan Atomic Energy Commission's chairman Mr. Munir Ahmad Khan.

An annual college based summer camp, it is organised by Pakistan Atomic Energy Commission and National Center For Physics while it is sponsored by International Center for Theoretical Physics and the Minister of Science and Technology of Pakistan. A Physics research centre, it is located in Nathiagali city of Pakistan, and its current director is dr. Riazuddin, a pupil student of professor Salam.

Objectives
Breaking the intellectual isolation of the scientist in the developing countries.
Keeping pace with the rapid progress in science and contemporary needs by promoting higher science education.
Placing due emphasis on the interaction of modern trends in physics and their applications in current technological development with special reference to the needs of the countries of the third world.
Promoting a scientific dialogue and provide opportunity and opening avenues for co-operation and joint research programs.
Broaden the outlook of the participants, to re-orient their scientific activities
Indicate the areas where research could be carried out with limited facilities of developing countries.

History
Professor Abdus Salam had played a major and an integral role in Pakistan's science policy. Professor Salam had supervised more than 21 PhD during his teaching career at the Imperial College, United Kingdom. Half of these students were Pakistanis in which the majority of students had returned to Pakistan to join Abdus Salam.

To promote scientific activities in the country, professor Abdus Salam had done the ground breaking work in establishing the research facilities throughout the country. In 1976, Abdus Salam had suggested to Prime minister Zulfikar Ali Bhutto to established the annual college to promote the scientific activities in the country. Munir Ahmad Khan, then-chairman of Pakistan Atomic Energy Commission (PAEC), took the task as he had strongly advocated for the program. In 1976, the first Summer college was established and 14 scientists from all over the world had attended the college for the first time. Professor George Deacon (Chemistry), Professor Roger Penrose (Mathematical Physics), Oliver Penrose (Mathematics), Alice Hanson Cook (Cornell University), Benjamin Whiso Lee (physics), Mujaddid Ahmed Ijaz (physics), Remo Ruffini (Physics) and others had attended the college.

Professor Riazuddin, who was at the time Chief Scientist (CS) at the PAEC, was overall in charge of organising the college both administratively and academically. He also was the co-director of the college with alongside of prof. Abdus Salam. After the departure of Professor Salam, Riazuddin has been director of the INSC since then.

Research and program emphasis

The institution is noted for its high-powered research in particle physics, nuclear physics, theoretical physics, astrophysics, nanotechnology, nuclear technology, Semiconductor physics, superconductor, general relativity, polymer physics, experimental physics, molecular physics, atomic physics, laser physics, cosmology and research on nuclear and particle detectors. The institution also host lectures in different fields of science and mathematics

The scientific organisations, such as PAEC, KRL, NCP, PCSIR and PEC, had delegated and invited hundreds of scientists from Asia, Africa, Europe, and Americas to participate in the annual event. During the last 32 years of INSC, nearly 950 foreign scientists from as many as 72 countries have participated in the proceedings of the College. INSC has served as a forum for people of different countries whose main problem is scientific isolation.

In 2010, approximately 6200 Pakistani scientists, engineers, and mathematicians had attended the college. The vast interaction among Pakistani scientists who have been drawn not only from research institutes but also from universities and colleges.

As of today, the college hosts post graduate students are invited to participate in this discourse of a high level. This link with universities and college is important since the ultimate source of technical manpower in any country is none other than the educational institutions.

References

External links
ncp.edu.pk/insc

Physics laboratories
Research institutes in Pakistan
Science and technology in Pakistan
Nuclear research institutes
Particle physics facilities
Physics institutes
Constituent institutions of Pakistan Atomic Energy Commission
Laboratories in Pakistan
1976 establishments in Pakistan
Abdus Salam